The Story of My Life or Story of My Life may refer to:

Literature
 The Story of My Life (biography), a 1903 autobiography by Helen Keller
 Story of My Life (novel), 1988 novel by Jay McInerney
 Histoire de ma vie (Story of my life), a memoir and autobiography by Giacomo Casanova
 The Story of My Life, an autobiography by Clarence Darrow
 The Story of My Life, an autobiography by Alma White
 The Story of My Life, and autobiography by Rosina Davies
 Histoire de ma vie (Story of my life), an autobiography by George Sand
 Povest o Zhizni (Story of a Life), an autobiography by Konstantin Georgiyevich Paustovsky

Music
 The Story of My Life (musical), a 2009 stage musical

Songs
 "The Story of My Life" (Marty Robbins song), written by Burt Bacharach and Hal David, popularized by Marty Robbins and by Michael Holliday
 "Story of My Life" (Kristian Leontiou song)
 "Story of My Life" (Lesley Roy song)
 "The Story of My Life" (Millencolin song)
 "Story of My Life" (One Direction song)
 "Story of My Life" (Rich Croin song)
 "Story of My Life" (Smash Mouth song)
 "Story of My Life" (Social Distortion song)
 "Story of My Life", a song by Automatic Loveletter from Truth or Dare
 "Story of My Life", a song by Billy Blue featuring Akon
 "Story of My Life", a song by Bon Jovi from 2005 album Have A Nice Day
 "Story of My Life", a song by Illenium and Sueco, featuring Trippie Redd
 "Story of My Life", a song by Loretta Lynn from Van Lear Rose
 "The Story of My Life", a song by Neil Diamond from Headed for the Future
 "The Story of My Life", a song by White Town from Peek & Poke
"Historyja majho žyccia (Story of My Life)", by Belarusian duo Naviband

Albums
 Story of My Life (album), by Pere Ubu
 The Story of My Life (Deana Carter album)
 The Story of My Life (Gangsta Pat album)
 The Story of My Life, an album by Eric Gales
 The Story of My Life, an album by Jennette McCurdy
 Story of My Life, an album by Marty Robbins
 Story of My Life, an album by Cita Citata

Other
 The Story of My Life (film), a 2004 French romantic comedy film

See also
 My Life Story, a pop group
 My Life (disambiguation)